Mario Leandro Silva Galhano (born 4 August 1982) is a Portuguese footballer currently playing in the Liga de Honra club Feirense as a defender wearing the number 3 shirt. He has been at the club since 2001 where he was a successful youth product and went through the ranks to the first team where he is the current team captain and one of the key players in the squad.

External links

1982 births
Living people
People from Águeda
Portuguese footballers
Association football defenders
C.D. Feirense players
Sportspeople from Aveiro District